Kabir Chowdhury (9 February 1923 – 13 December 2011) was a Bangladeshi academic, essayist, materialist, translator, cultural worker and civil society activist.

Early life and education
Chowdhury was born in Brahmanbaria of the then Tipperah district of the Bengal Presidency where his father was working as a civil servant. His father, Khan Bahadur Abdul Halim Chowdhury, was a district magistrate. He grew up in an atmosphere of liberal ideas and secular thinking. His family hailed from Chatkhile of Noakhali district of Bangladesh and his father was a devout Muslim. Kabir's many close friends in school belonged to the Hindu community. When he studied English literature at the Dhaka University in the early 1940s he was greatly impressed by the writings of H.G. Wells, George Bernard Shaw and Bertrand Russell, among others. During the second World War he was deeply troubled by the Nazi atrocities carried out in their concentration camps, the mass killing of Jews as a plan of ethnic cleansing and the destruction of all democratic norms. Kabir's faith in democracy, secularism and liberal thoughts grew stronger by the day and he found himself drawn to socialist ideology.

Educated at the universities of Dhaka, Minnesota and Southern California, Kabir Chowdhury worked for over half a century in the fields of education, peace and inter-cultural understanding in several national and international organisations like Afro-Asian Writers Union, Afro-Asian Peoples Solidarity Organization, International Theatre Institute, UNESCO National Commission and Bangladesh Chapter of the World's Peace Council.

Career
Chowdhury has written extensively on world's famous writers and painters. He has also written extensively on peace and conflict resolution through discussion and has tried to promote these values by his work as a teacher and as an administrator. He taught at Dhaka College (Dhaka) and B. M. College, Barisal (as Principal) and few years at University of Dhaka as a Professor of English. He has worked as the Secretary, Ministry of Education, Cultural Affairs & Sports, Government of Bangladesh before his voluntary retirement from government service. He was inducted as National Professor of Bangladesh in 1998.

Chowdhury was a member of the Presidium of the Bangladesh World Peace Council and headed the Bangladesh-Soviet Friendship Society for over a decade. He was the president of the Bangladesh Vidyasagar Society and chairman of the Advisory Council of Ekatturer Ghatak Dalal Nirmul Committee (Committee for Resisting the Killers and Collaborators of 1971). In all the above capacities he has significantly contributed to the dissemination of secular ideas and democratic values. His ideology is materialism. He has written extensively on anti-fundamentalism, religious fanaticism and communalism, and has stressed the need for developing broad human values and for realising the importance of cultural diversity, and the imperatives for developing a pluralistic society.

In his long career, Chowdhury spoke at many national and international meetings of writers and social activists on literature, socialism, secularism and democracy. He addressed gatherings in Germany, Russia, USA, Bulgaria, Angola, Japan, Pakistan and India. He had the privilege of meeting Nelson Mandela, Yassir Arafat, Agostinho Neto and Kim Il Sung. In a conference of the World Federation of UN Associations held in Barcelona which he attended as the representative of Bangladesh UN Association (he was its chairman for several years), he worked alongside Nobel Peace winner Lord Philip Noel Baker and the distinguished pacifist Sean Mac Bride. Among famous writers, he worked closely with Pakistan's Faiz Ahmed Faiz, India's Visam Sahni, Palestine's Mahmood Dervish and USA's Edward Albee.

Chowdhury played a leading role in many movements in Bangladesh, especially in the anti-communal movement, movement to establish democracy, and significantly in the movement to ensure the trial of those who had committed crimes against humanity and war crimes during the War of Liberation of Bangladesh in 1971.

Works
 Chekhover Galpa (Chekov's Stories, 1969)
 Samudrer Swad (Taste of the Sea, 1970)
 Great Gatsby (1971)
 The Grapes of Wrath (1989)
 Rupantar (The Metamorphosis (1990)
 Beowulf (1985)
 All the King's Men (1992)
 Girl with a Pearl Earring (2007)
 Galpa Upanyase Pratikriti Chitra (Portraits in Stories and Novels, 2007)

Awards
 Independence Day Award (1997)
 National Professor of Bangladesh (1998)
 Ekushey Padak (1991)
 Bangla Academy Literary Award (1973)
 Mohammad Nasiruddin Literary Award (1986)
 William Carey Award (1994)
 Tagore Peace Award

References

External links
  বিডিনিউজ টুয়েন্টিফোর ডটকমঃ কবীর চৌধুরীর সঙ্গে আলাপ (বেবী মওদুদ/ অক্টোবর ২০০৯)
 Collection of Kabir Chowdhury's books online

1923 births
2011 deaths
People from Brahmanbaria district
Bangladeshi secularists
Bengali-language writers
Bengali writers
Translators to Bengali
Translators to English
Bangladeshi translators
20th-century translators
University of Dhaka alumni
Academic staff of the University of Dhaka
University of Minnesota alumni
USC Sol Price School of Public Policy alumni
National Professors of Bangladesh
Recipients of the Ekushey Padak
Recipients of the Independence Day Award
20th-century Bangladeshi male writers
Recipients of Bangla Academy Award
People from Chatkhil Upazila